Provogue is an Indian clothing and accessories retailer based in Mumbai, Maharashtra. It was launched in 1997 as a menswear fashion brand for contemporary clothing. Over the years the brand has expanded its collection of men’s and women’s fashion apparel and accessories.

Sponsorship
Provouge was the apparel sponsor of Indian cricket league. They also became the kit sponsor of Rajasthan Royals in 2015 and the deal was ended in 2017.
As of 2010, Hrithik Roshan was the brand ambassador for Provogue. while Mahesh Babu is the brand ambassador for Provogue in South India.

Products

As of 2014, Provogue stores have men's clothing and women's clothing, each of these being subdivided in Lower Garment, Upper Garment, Shoes and Accessories. Most recently, Provogue has introduced a range of unisex deodorants, watches and sunglasses to complement the collections.

Stores

There are over 50 Provogue stores located across 40 cities in India.

On 1 July 2013, Provogue announced the launch of its e-commerce business portal.

On September 18, 2019, a two-judge division bench of the National Company Law Tribunal (NCLT) in Mumbai ordered the liquidation of readymade garment maker Provogue (India) Ltd after lenders did not agree on the offers on the table for the company.

Recognitions
The Brand Trust Report listed Provogue in the top 100 Most Trusted brands of India published by Trust Research Advisory in 2011.

References

External links
 http://www.provogue.com
 https://www.facebook.com/provogue
 https://twitter.com/provogue_india

Companies based in Mumbai
Retail companies of India
Textile companies of India
Retail companies established in 1997
1997 establishments in Maharashtra
Clothing brands of India
Sportswear brands